William Henry Moody (1853–1917) was an Attorney General of the United States. Attorney General Moody may also refer to:

Ashley Moody (born 1975), Attorney General of Florida
Dan Moody (1893–1966), Attorney General of Texas

See also
General Moody (disambiguation)